Speculations was a resource for writers within the science fiction, fantasy, and other speculative fiction subgenres. Started in 1994 as a print magazine, Speculations moved online in 2000, then ceased operations in 2008.  Speculations was a Hugo Award for Best Semiprozine nominee seven times. Kent Brewster was the publisher.

Editors included Kent Brewster, Susan Fry and Denise Lee.

References

External links
 Speculations

American literature websites
Defunct science fiction magazines published in the United States
Magazines established in 1994
Magazines disestablished in 2000
Online magazines with defunct print editions
Online magazines published in the United States